Eóin Tennyson (born 17 May 1998) is a Northern Irish Alliance Party politician who has served as a Member of the Legislative Assembly (MLA) for Upper Bann since the 2022 Northern Ireland Assembly election.

Early life and career 
Tennyson attended St. Patrick's Academy, a Catholic grammar school in Dungannon, County Tyrone. He studied accounting at Queen's University Belfast, graduating with bachelor of science degree in 2019. While at university, he was elected chair of Alliance Youth. In 2020, he obtained a Master of Accounting from the Michael Smurfit Graduate Business School at University College Dublin. He subsequently joined Deloitte in Belfast as an auditor and began training as a chartered accountant.

Political career

Early career 
Tennyson was elected to Armagh City, Banbridge and Craigavon Borough Council in the 2019 local elections, representing the Lagan River district electoral area. He polled 10.81% of the first-preference votes, and gained a seat at the expense of the Ulster Unionist Party.

In December, he contested the 2019 general election in Upper Bann, placing third with 13% of the vote. Though unsuccessful, he obtained a swing of 8.4% and polled ahead of Doug Beattie of the UUP and Dolores Kelly of the SDLP.

Member of the Legislative Assembly 
Tennyson was elected as a Member of the Legislative Assembly (MLA) for Upper Bann in the 2022 Assembly election, outpolling the leader of the Ulster Unionist Party and gaining a seat at the expense of the SDLP's Dolores Kelly. He polled 6,440 (11.5%) first-preference votes, increasing Alliance's share by 6.2% on the previous Assembly election. Tennyson became the first non-designated politician to be elected for the Upper Bann constituency. At 23-years-old, he also became the youngest MLA elected to the Assembly, and gained the unofficial title of Baby of the House. He is the third openly gay MLA to serve, joining his party colleagues John Blair and Andrew Muir.

During the course of the 2022 campaign, Tennyson faced abuse and intimidation. On one occasion, he was verbally abused and told to leave a 'Protestant area' when canvassing in Lurgan.

At a sitting of the Assembly on 30 May 2022, Tennyson accused the Democratic Unionist Party of treating the public as "leverage", after the party refused to assent to the election of a Speaker and blocked formation of an Assembly in protest over the Northern Ireland Protocol. He subsequently called on the Secretary of State for Northern Ireland to stop the salaries of MLAs who refused to enter the Assembly in order to incentivise the DUP to "get back to work".

Personal life 
Tennyson came out as gay at age 19.

References

External links 

Living people
Alliance Party of Northern Ireland MLAs
Northern Ireland MLAs 2022–2027
LGBT politicians from Northern Ireland
Gay politicians
Alumni of Queen's University Belfast
Alumni of University College Dublin
1998 births
Gay men from Northern Ireland